Magnetic Bearing Flywheel Experimental System (MABES), also known as  is a National Space Development Agency of Japan(NASDA) satellite mission. It conducted experiments on the levitation of the magnetic bearing flywheel in a zero-G environment, and tested the function of the launch lock mechanism.

On 12 August 1986, Jindai was launched from Tanegashima Space Center aboard the maiden flight of H-I rocket, along with Ajisai and Fuji.

Jindai is attached to the second stage of the H-1 rocket, and as of 2013, still remains in low Earth orbit.

References

Satellites of Japan
Spacecraft launched in 1986